With Suspicious Minds is the sixth studio album by Croatian singer and songwriter Vesna Pisarović, globally released on 6 June 2012 by Jazzwerkstatt. It is her first album to be primarily recorded in English. After the release of her fifth studio album Peti, she felt the need to grow artistically and release a jazz album. The album features fifteen cover versions of popular songs originally performed by Elvis Presley.

Background
Pisarović's last studio album Peti was released in late 2005 through Hit Records. After the album release Pisarović announced on her web site that she would go on an indefinite hiatus to pursue an academic career. She enrolled in the Royal Conservatory of The Hague. She later moved to Berlin, Germany where the recording process of "With Suspicious Minds" started. According to Pisarović the main inspiration for the album was to "not change the musical texture of the songs but to explore Elvis' musical roots with an ironic approach."

Track listing
Credits adapted from AllMusic.

Release history

References

2012 albums
Elvis Presley tribute albums
Vesna Pisarović albums